Patrick James Lynch (born 2 March 1962), known professionally as P. J. Lynch, is an Irish artist and illustrator of children's books. He has won a number of awards, including two Kate Greenaway Medals and three Christopher Awards. His most successful book, The Christmas Miracle of Jonathan Toomey by Susan Wojciechowski, has sold more than a million copies in the United States alone.

Early life
Lynch was born in Belfast, Northern Ireland in 1962 as the youngest of five children to a Catholic family. His mother's family was from Dunloy, County Antrim and the family often spent their summers there. Lynch was interested in art from an early age and spent his free time drawing on any scrap of paper he could find. He credits one of his three brothers, Denis, as who inspired him to start drawing. He recalls that Belfast during The Troubles was a "scary" place for a teenager, and he used drawing and reading as a "way of escaping for a while from the horrors that were happening around me in the real world."

As a child, he thought his drawing skills could be applied to a career in architecture but lost interest in his early teens. He attended St. Malachy's College for secondary school. Both his parents were very supportive of his decision to pursue art school. and he continued on to Brighton College of Art, where he was tutored by Raymond Briggs. At the time, Briggs headed the illustration department and encouraged Lynch to pursue a career as an illustrator, which he did upon graduating in 1984.

Career

Book illustrations 
Lynch's first illustrated book was A Bag of Moonshine by Alan Garner (1986), a collection of folklore tales from England and Wales. In 1987, he was presented with the Mother Goose Award, which recognises the "most exciting newcomer to British children's book illustration." Since then, folklore and other traditional stories, legends, and fairytales, have been regular subjects in his work.

Susan Wojciechowski's book The Christmas Miracle of Jonathan Toomey has been considered a Christmas classic since selling out within three weeks of its first publication in 1995. Lynch initially turned down the opportunity to illustrate the book, afraid he would not do it justice, but later changed his mind. He dedicated himself so deeply to the story that he hired actors to help create a world he could put on paper. The book won both Lynch's first Kate Greenaway Medal and his first Christopher Award. According to WorldCat, more than 3,096 member libraries worldwide own at least one copy of Jonathan Toomey.

Lynch won his second Greenaway Medal in 1997 and his second Christopher Award in 1998 for illustrating When Jessie Came Across the Sea by Amy Hest. His third Christopher Award came from Grandad's Prayers of the Earth by Douglas Wood in 2009. In 2014, he won the Bisto Book of the Year Honour Award for Illustration for Mysterious Traveller by Mal Peet and Elspeth Graham. He has also been nominated twice (2010, 2014) for the Hans Christian Andersen Award. In 2016, he was named the fourth Laureate na nÓg, following Siobhan Parkinson, Niamh Sharkey, and Eoin Colfer.

Other media
Lynch has worked in a number of areas other than illustrations for children's books, including creating posters for Opera Ireland and for the Abbey Theatre's 2016 production of The Importance of Being Earnest. He has designed a number of stamps for An Post, including Christmas sets and individual stamps inspired by books such as Gulliver's Travels and The Happy Prince. He was commissioned by Cavan County Library for two large oil paintings inspired by Gulliver's Travels to hang in their entrance. As with Jonathan Toomey, Lynch acted out the characters in his library paintings to get a better sense of their world. In 2020, he designed a 14 metre by 14 metre, 1.5 million-piece mosaic featuring the Virgin Mary for Knock Basilica in County Mayo.

Lynch also lectures and holds workshops at galleries (e.g., the National Gallery of Ireland), conferences, events (e.g., Irish Film Institute's Family Festival), and colleges (e.g., the Long Room at Trinity College Dublin. As Laureate na nÓg, he hosted a video podcast series called The Big Picture! featuring drawing techniques. In 2019, he was commissioned by the Royal Mint to design the Year of the Rat (2020) coin in the Mint's Shēngxiào Collection. In 2021, he was again chosen to create a coin, this time featuring a woman of colour; he chose to draw Britannia as a Black woman.

Despite not initially being interested in writing, Lynch has published two books: The Boy Who Fell Off the Mayflower, or John Howland's Good Fortune (2015) and The Haunted Lake (2020).

Style
Lynch illustrates using mainly watercolors and gouache and illustrations are considered painterly. They are typically colorful, detailed, and realistic, and are lauded for their "exceptional range of texture and colour" Each of Lynch's works begins with him reading and rereading the story until he gets a sense of what he wants to draw; he then produces rough sketches that he can later polish and turn into a final product. He tries to avoid using too many digital programs "in case they get too slick" and, while he already has a distinctive, traditional style, he is open to trying new techniques such as the "charcoal and chalk rubbing" he did for The Boy Who Fell Off the Mayflower.

Research plays a large part in Lynch's creative process and he has been known to act out or hire actors to play characters in the story so he can get a visual sense of the scene he wants to capture. Historical accuracy and cultural respect are important enough to him that, while illustrating Jessie Came Across the Sea, he consulted the Jewish Museum in New York City to ensure he was correctly depicting Jewish immigrant life. For stories centering on humans, Lynch often relies on photographs and his actors wearing historically accurate garb to help visualise body language, but rarely uses this method when working with fairytales and folklore.

Lynch was influenced by Arthur Rackham and Edmund Dulac in his early years, and later Maxfield Parrish, NC Wyeth, Norman Rockwell, Alan Lee, Gennady Spirin, and Brian Selznick.

Personal life
Lynch and his three children live in Dublin. His second cousin is playwright Martin Lynch.

Published works

As author

As illustrator

See also

References

External links 
 
 

Alumni of the University of Brighton
Irish children's book illustrators
Irish illustrators
Kate Greenaway Medal winners
Irish stamp designers 
1962 births
Living people
Artists from Belfast
Illustrators from Northern Ireland
Artists from Northern Ireland
Painters from Northern Ireland